Same as Sunday is an American Christian punk band that primarily plays a style of pop punk and punk rock music. They originated in Indianapolis, Indiana, where the band started making music in 2005 with frontman Chris Bauchle. They released two extended plays, called The Dollar for Dollar, in 2009 and Earn Your Stripes, in 2010, which were both independently released.

Background
Same as Sunday is a Christian punk band from Indianapolis, Indiana, where they formed in 2005. Their members are lead vocalist and guitarist, Chris Bauchle, guitarist and background vocalist, Kyle Martin, bassist and background vocalist, Nick Berry, and drummer and background vocalist, Andy "the" Heck.

Music history
The band commenced as a musical entity in 2005, with their first release, The Dollar for Dollar, an extended play, that was released on July 7, 2009, Their subsequent extended play, Earn Your Stripes, was released on October 26, 2010, independently.

Members
Current members
 Chris Bauchle - lead vocals, guitar
 Kyle Martin - guitar, backing vocals
 Nick Berry - bass, backing vocals
 Andy "the" Heck - drums, backing vocals

Discography
EPs
 The Dollar for Dollar (July 7, 2009)
 Earn Your Stripes (October 26, 2010)
 Heroes & Villains (June 2, 2016)

References

External links
Facebook profile

Musical groups from Indianapolis
2005 establishments in Indiana
Musical groups established in 2005